Le'Nard Damon Castile, Jr (born September 7, 1987) is an American football wide receiver for the Idaho Horsemen of the American West Football Conference. He was assigned to the New Orleans VooDoo after going undrafted in the 2011 NFL Draft. He played college football at Delta State University.

Early life
Born the son of Pamela D. Castile, L.J. attended La Marque High School in La Marque, Texas. He was listed as an All-Region selection by Prep Star magazine, and a three-star recruit and ranked as the No. 47 quarterback by Scout.com. Picked up a three-star ranking by Rivals.com. He was a member of the Houston Chronicle Top 100 list and selected to the State 100 by the Fort Worth Star-Telegram. Helped lead the team to a 13-1 record and a Regional Championship. He won district 23-4A MVP and also Player of the Year. He was selected by Galveston Daily News to its All-Country First-team. Threw for 1,155 yards and 17 touchdowns and rushed for 718 yards and 11 scores as a senior. Completed 93 of 179 passes for 1,200 yards and 6 touchdowns and had 90 rushes for 387 yards as a junior. Also lettered in basketball and was ’04-’05 Co-MVP and won the Dennis Rodman Award.

College career

Houston
Castile continued his athletic career at the University of Houston. His first year, he redshirted, then he lettered three seasons (’07-’09). Made collegiate debut against the Oregon Ducks in ’07. For his career with the Cougars, had 60 receptions for 854 yards and 16 touchdowns, while accounting for three blocked kicks

Delta State
In 2010, Castile transferred to Delta State University. There he helped lead the Statesmen to the NCAA Division II National Championship game by leading the Statesmen receiving corps in all categories with 67 catches for 900 yards and 13 touchdowns. He had many long receptions for big gains including a long of 56 for an overall average 13.4. Also rushed on reverse sweeps three times for 28 yards. Threw one pass for 38 yards versus Ouachita Baptist. Had nine catches for 89 yards and three touchdowns versus West Alabama, including the game-winner with nineteen seconds remaining. Pulled down seven catches for 80 yards and a touchdown in the championship game. Named First-team All-Gulf South Conference. First-team Daktronics All Super Regional Team. Third-team Don Hansen All-Super Region II team selection. Impressed scouts at the Cactus Bowl with 3 receptions for 122 yards and a score.

Professional career

New Orleans VooDoo
Signed with the New Orleans VooDoo on June 21, 2011.

Cleveland Browns
Signed with the Cleveland Browns for training camp.

Utah Blaze
Castile has signed with the Utah Blaze for the 2013 season.

Return to New Orleans VooDoo
On May 15, 2013, The Blaze traded Castile to the New Orleans VooDoo, along with Bryce Tennison, for future considerations.

Chicago Slaughter
On December 5, 2013, Castile signed with the Chicago Slaughter of the Continental Indoor Football League (CIFL). When the Slaughter folded, he re-joined the VooDoo.

Los Angeles KISS
On June 19, 2014, Castile was traded to the Los Angeles KISS for future considerations. On July 16, 2015, Castile was activated by the KISS.

Ottawa Redblacks
Castile was signed to the Ottawa Redblacks practice roster on September 29, 2014. On June 5, 2015, Castile was released.

Jacksonville Sharks
On March 10, 2016, Castile was assigned to the Jacksonville Sharks. On March 25, 2016, Castile was placed on recallable reassignment.

Bloomington Edge
On October 31, 2016, Castile was assigned to the Bloomington Edge. He was released on April 5, 2017.

Washington Valor
On June 1, 2017, Castile was assigned to the Washington Valor. On July 7, 2017, Castile was placed on reassignment. On July 12, 2017, Castile was placed on league suspension.

Georgia Doom
Castile signed with the Georgia Doom for the 2018 season.

References

External links
 L.J. Castile - Cleveland Browns bio

1987 births
Living people
American football wide receivers
Chicago Slaughter players
Cleveland Browns players
Houston Cougars football players
Delta State Statesmen football players
Edmonton Elks players
Los Angeles Kiss players
New Orleans VooDoo players
People from La Marque, Texas
Saskatchewan Roughriders players
Utah Blaze players
Jacksonville Sharks players
Bloomington Edge players
Washington Valor players
American Arena League players
Players of American football from Texas